Thomas Morris Kennedy (7 July 1906 – 11 May 1968) was an Australian rules footballer who played with Carlton in the Victorian Football League (VFL).

Family
The son of Tristam Charles Kennedy (1857–1916) and Daisy Mary Kennedy (1881–1948), née Morris, Thomas Morris Kennedy was born at Carlton North, Victoria on 7 July 1906. 

He married Enid Ruby Mavis Tippett (1912–1999) in 1933.

Football
Kennedy was a follower-forward from Chelsea who played one game for Carlton in Round 1 of the 1927 season, playing in a forward pocket when Carlton met South Melbourne at Princes Park.

Kennedy was granted a permit to Brunswick in June 1927, and subsequently played 18 games for them. During the 1928 season he was granted a clearance to Fitzroy, but he never played a senior game for them.

War service
Kennedy served with Australia’s Volunteer Defence Force during World War II.

Death
Tom Kennedy died on 11 May 1968.

Notes

External links 
 
 Tom Kennedy's profile at Blueseum.
 T. M. Kennedy, at The VFA Project. 

1906 births
1968 deaths
Australian rules footballers from Victoria (Australia)
Carlton Football Club players
Brunswick Football Club players